This Is London is the second album by the west London post punk and indie band, The Times. It was released in 1983.

Track listing
Side A
This Is London - 3:25 
Goodbye Piccadilly - 3:33 
Whatever Happened To Thamesbeat - 3:03 
If Only - 3:35 
Big Painting - 3:29
Goodnight Children Everywhere - 2:27 
Side B
The Party - 3:42 
Stranger Than Fiction - 2:54 
(There's A) Cloud Over Liverpool - 3:23 
Will Success Spoil Fran Summit? - 1:07 
The Chimes Of Big Ben - 3:52 
This Green And Pleasant Land - 5:34

References

The Times (band) albums
1983 albums